Robert Kenneth "Bob" Sneath (born 24 June 1949) is a former Australian politician, and was a Labor Party member of the South Australian Legislative Council from 2000 to 2012.

Sneath originally worked as a shearer and an organiser with the AWU.  He moved to Adelaide in 2004 to become Secretary of the AWU, and was the President of the Naracoorte sub branch of the ALP for six years before becoming an ALP State Executive member and President of the party in 1999.

Sneath was President of the South Australian Legislative Council until his resignation in October 2012.

External links

References

 

1949 births
Living people
Members of the South Australian Legislative Council
Presidents of the South Australian Legislative Council
Australian Labor Party members of the Parliament of South Australia
21st-century Australian politicians